Yoko Miyake (born 22 December 1973) is a Japanese snowboarder. She competed in the women's halfpipe event at the 2002 Winter Olympics.

References

1973 births
Living people
Japanese female snowboarders
Olympic snowboarders of Japan
Snowboarders at the 2002 Winter Olympics
Sportspeople from Hyōgo Prefecture
21st-century Japanese women